Gary Grainey is a former professional rugby league footballer who played in the 1990s. He played at representative level for Ireland, and at club level for Leigh Miners Rangers and Leigh Centurions (Heritage № 1103).

International honours
Gary Grainey won caps for Ireland while at Leigh Miners Rangers 1995 2-caps plus 1 as substitute.

References

Ireland national rugby league team players
Living people
Place of birth missing (living people)
Leigh Leopards players
Leigh Miners Rangers players
Year of birth missing (living people)